The Union Safe Deposit Bank was founded in Stockton, California, United States in April 1897. It was purchased in 2004 by the Bank of the West, and all its branches were converted to Bank of the West on January 24, 2005.

References

Defunct banks of the United States
Companies based in San Joaquin County, California
Banks disestablished in 2005
Banks established in 1897
Defunct companies based in California